is a Japanese swimmer. She competed in the women's 4 × 100 metre freestyle relay event at the 2018 Asian Games, winning the gold medal.

As a 14-year-old at the 2014 Junior Pan Pacific Swimming Championships in Hawaii, United States, Shirai won the gold medal in the 200 metre backstroke with a 2:11.67, the bronze medal in the 100 metre backstroke with a 1:01.82, and a silver medal in the 4×100 metre medley relay with a final relay time of 4:04.11. The following edition, the 2016 Junior Pan Pacific Swimming Championships also held in Hawaii, United States, she won a bronze medal in the 4×200 metre freestyle relay, splitting a 1:59.88 for the fourth leg of the relay to help achieve a final time of 8:08.12.

References

External links
 

1999 births
Living people
Japanese female freestyle swimmers
Place of birth missing (living people)
Asian Games medalists in swimming
Asian Games gold medalists for Japan
Asian Games silver medalists for Japan
Swimmers at the 2018 Asian Games
Medalists at the 2018 Asian Games
Swimmers at the 2020 Summer Olympics
Olympic swimmers of Japan